In marketing, a publicity stunt is a planned event designed to attract the public's attention to the event's organizers or their cause. Publicity stunts can be professionally organized, or set up by amateurs. Such events are frequently utilized by both advertisers and celebrities, the majority of whom are notable athletes and politicians.

Organizations sometimes seek publicity by staging newsworthy events that attract media coverage. They can be in the form of groundbreakings, world record attempts, dedications, press conferences, or organized protests. By staging and managing these types of events, the organizations attempt to gain some form of control over what is reported in the media. Successful publicity stunts have news value, offer photo, video, and sound bite opportunities, and are arranged primarily for media coverage.

It can be difficult for organizations to design successful publicity stunts that highlight the message instead of burying it. For example, it makes sense for a pizza company to bake the world's largest pizza, but it would not make sense for the YMCA to sponsor that same event. The importance of publicity stunts is for generating news interest and awareness for the concept, product, or service being marketed.

Notable publicity stunts

JP Morgan and Ringling Brothers 
In 1933, J.P. Morgan was summoned to appear before Senate Banking and Currency Committee due to their suspicions of his previous banking activity throughout the financial crash. During the congressional hearings, U.S. Senator Carter Glass remarked that the proceedings had turned into a circus as things had begun to appear out of hand. The Ringling Brothers as well as Barnum & Bailey Circus were both in D.C. at the time of the hearing. Thus, they interpreted Senator Glass' remarks as an invitation and asked their press agent to place a female circus dwarf named Lya Graf, on Morgan's lap during one of the hearings. While the addition of the small lady surprised Morgan and infuriated Glass, it also got loads of publicity for Ringling Brothers Circus.

Calendar Girls 
In 1999, a group of 11 women from the Women's Institute (in Yorkshire, UK) stripped for a calendar to raise money for Leukemia Research. Setting a goal of $5,000, the group of Women's Institute women feared that they would struggle to sell even a 1,000 copies. The calendar released was eventually released on April 12, 1999, and featured all 11 women posing nude – obscured by baked goods, flower arrangements, sewing adornments, teapots, song sheets, and even a grand piano. Despite leaving people of this time stunned, over 800,000 copies of the calendar were sold worldwide. After its initial release in 1999, the calendar raised over 5 million euros or over 4.8 million U.S dollars. This publicity stunt eventually went on to inspire a multitude of media productions including a British comedy film, titled Calendar Girls in 2003, a West End show in 2009, and a musical production in 2012, titled The Girls. Tricia Stewart, one of the original calendar girls, also known as Miss October, even went on to publish her own autobiography, Calendar Girl, in which she retells the initial creation of the publicity stunt and how it changed their lives forever.

See also
Edward Bernays
Guerrilla marketing
Photo op
Media circus
Media prank
Stunting (broadcasting)
 Viral marketing
Pseudo-event

References

 
Public relations techniques
Stunt
Mass media events